Indra IV (ruled 973–982 CE) was the last Rashtrakuta ruler and a nephew of the feudatory king of Western Ganga Dynasty of Talakad. The Ganga king Marasimha II tried hard to keep the dwindling Rashtrakuta Empire intact after the betrayal and invasion of Parmaras of Malwa but in vain. Marasimha II committed Sallekhana in 975 and Indra IV followed him in 982 at Shravanabelagola.
 Thus, the dynasty of Rashtrakutas vanished into history. However, several related families had come to power in various parts of India during the imperial expansion of the Manyakheta Empire. These kingdoms such as the Lattalura and Saundatti branches continued to rule for several centuries.

See also 
 Branches of Rashtrakuta Dynasty

References

External links 
 History of Karnataka, Mr. Arthikaje

982 deaths
Hindu monarchs
Rashtrakuta dynasty
10th-century monarchs in Asia